Aranda de Duero is a city and municipality, capital of the Ribera del Duero comarca, in the south of the province of Burgos, in Castile and León, Spain. It has a population of roughly 33,000 people and lies on the River Duero. The closest international airport is Madrid Barajas.

Description
The municipality of Aranda de Duero is made up of three towns: Aranda de Duero (seat or capital), La Aguilera and Sinovas.

Aranda de Duero is the capital of the Ribera del Duero wine region. The town is unique for having wine cellars that interconnect below the streets of the town centre. Wine clubs (peñas) celebrate special events in these cellars.

Location
Aranda de Duero is at the junction of several transport routes across Spain. The N1 autovía (known as A-1) runs north / south by Aranda, along which visitors and import/export goods travel between Madrid and the south coast. Another important road running east to west connects Portugal with important cities on the way (e.g. Zamora, Valladolid, Soria) and the east coast. Its location at the juncture of these routes has led to Aranda de Duero acquiring a growing recognition and function as a business centre. Several multinational corporations, such as Michelin and GlaxoSmithKline have large facilities in the area.

Climate
Aranda de Duero has a warm-summer Mediterranean climate (Köppen Csb) with cold winters.

History
The Council of Aranda, an ecclesiastical synod, was held at Aranda de Duero in 1473 by Alfonso Carillo, Archbishop of Toledo, to overcome the ignorance and evil lives of ecclesiastics. Among the twenty-nine canons of the council is one which says that orders shall not be conferred on those who are ignorant of Latin. Several canons deal with clerical concubinage, simony, clandestine marriages, etc.

Culture
A dish called "Lechazo" is a local speciality. This is roast baby lamb and is usually served with a basic salad and much "torta" bread for dipping in the meat juices.

Festivals and events
The Fiestas to honour la Virgen de las Viñas (Our Lady of the Vines) take place on the first Sunday after 8 September. They last for nine days from the eve of that Sunday (the Big Day) until the following Sunday when the Fiestas end with the traditional fireworks at midnight, followed by "the sardine burial".

The annual Sonorama music festival is held in the city in mid-August.

Gallery

Wine caves

Places of interest

Santa María la Real is a church built by Simon de Colonia during the 15th and 16th centuries. Its most notable feature is the main doorway. Above the doorway, three carved stone reliefs show Christ carrying the Cross, The Crucifixion and The Resurrection. The doorway is topped by the coat of arms of King Ferdinand II of Aragon and Queen Isabella I of Castile. Aranda's own coats of arms is also present along with scenes from the Nativity and other Christian celebrations. Due to their deterioration, the church doors have been replaced by exact copies, the original ones are kept in the Museo Sacro.

San Juan, a church, older than Santa Maria and gothic in style, San Juan still has its fortified defensive tower. The Council of Aranda took place in San Juan in 1473. Nowadays San Juan houses the Museo Sacro.

The Virgen de las Viñas Sanctuary is a 17th-century hermitage. It is situated on a small hill to the north of the town. The patron saint of the town is the Virgen de las Viñas, the local legend says that she was found in a vineyard, hence the name.

The Train museum is situated in the old train station "Chelva" and documents the history of Spanish railways.

The Pottery museum houses pottery from all over Spain, with the largest collection from Castile and León.

The Berdugo's palace is a Renaissance mansion.

Bodegas; under the town centre there is a labyrinth of cellars, they were dug between the 12th and 17th centuries. Their original purpose was to store the food and wine that makes the Ribera del Duero famous. Nowadays the Cellars are home to the "Peñas", cultural associations whose main function is to preserve the cellars, organise social events and ensure the whole of the population enjoy the Fiestas.

San Juan de la Vera Cruz Parish Church.

San Nicolas de Bari is a church in the village of Sinovas.

The Conchuela Bridge.

The Romanesque Bridge is situated next to the San Juan Church.

The Humilladero is a stone monument on the route to Las Viñas Sanctuary.

Isilla street is the main pedestrian thoroughfare of the town. Local tradition has it that anyone living in Aranda will walk along this street every day.

Kikos  is a small store in the main square, it offers a wide variety of different lollies, chips, drinks and toys

Twin towns – sister cities

Aranda de Duero is twinned with:

 Langen, Germany
 Miranda do Douro, Portugal
 Romorantin-Lanthenay, France
 Roseburg, United States
 Salon-de-Provence, France
 Santa Cruz de Tenerife, Spain

Notable people 
Juan Carlos Higuero

See also 
La Aguilera is a small village in the municipality.

References

Sources and external links

Info & Photos of Aranda in English & Spanish
Ayuntamiento de Aranda de Duero
Web of music and the support to the groups of Aranda de Duero

 
Municipalities in the Province of Burgos